John Bright (born March 1940) is an Academy Award-winning costume designer. John Bright won the Oscar in for Best Costumes for the film A Room with a View during the 1986 Oscars. He shared the win with Jenny Beavan.

Academy Award nominations 

 1995 - Sense and Sensibility - Shared with Jenny Beavan. Lost to Restoration.
 1993 - The Remains of the Day - Shared with Jenny Beavan. Lost to The Age of Innocence.
 1992 - Howards End - Shared with Jenny Beavan. Lost to Bram Stoker's Dracula.
 1987 - Maurice - Shared with Jenny Beavan. Lost to The Last Emperor.
 1986 - A Room with a View - Shared with Jenny Beavan. Won
 1984 - The Bostonians - Shared with Jenny Beavan. Lost to Amadeus.

Filmography 

 Carmilla (2019)
 The White Countess (2005)
 The Magnificent Ambersons (2002)
 The Golden Bowl (2000)
 The Last September (1999)
 Onegin (1999)
 The Portrait of the Lady (1996) 
 Twelfth Night or What You Will (1996)
 Jefferson in Paris (1995)
 Sense and Sensibility (1995)
 The Remains of the Day  (1993)
 White Fang (1991)
 Mountains of the Moon (1990)
 The Deceivers (1988)
 Maurice (1987)
 A Room with a View (1986)
 The Bostonians (1984)

References

External links 
 

Living people
1940 births
Best Costume Design Academy Award winners
Best Costume Design BAFTA Award winners
British costume designers